Dawei (RTGS: Thawai, ; formerly known as Tavoy) is a city in south-eastern Myanmar and is the capital of the Tanintharyi Region, formerly known as the Tenasserim Division, on the northern bank of the Dawei River. Its population (2014 estimate) is 146,964. Dawei is a port at the head of the Dawei River estuary, . from the Andaman Sea. As a result, the city is prone to flooding during the monsoon season. "Dawei" is also the name of one of Myanmar's 135 ethnic minorities.

Etymology
Dawei derives from the Mon language term hawai, which means 'to sit cross-legged', in reference to the Buddha's sitting posture on the palin (throne).

History
The area around the Dawei River estuary has been inhabited for centuries by Dawei, Mon, Kayin, and Thai mariners.

As the ancient site, Sagara City, old Dawei, which is approx 6 miles north of present city, has so many traces of Pyu culture, it was recognized as one of the province capital in ancient Pyu era.

From the 11th to 13th centuries, Dawei was part of the Pagan Empire. From 1287 to 1564, Dawei became part of the Sukhothai Kingdom and its successor Ayutthaya Kingdom (Siam). From 1564 to 1594, Dawei was part of the Toungoo Kingdom of Burma. Siam temporarily regained the city between 1594 and 1614. From 1614 to the 1740s, Dawei was the southernmost city under Burmese authority, and was defended by a Burmese garrison. In the late-1740s, during the Burmese civil war of 1740–1757, Dawei, along with the northern Tenasserim coast, was taken over by Siam. Burma regained the city in 1760, and extended its control over the entire Tenasserim coast in 1765. The Tenasserim coast was ceded to the British after the First Anglo-Burmese War (1824–1826).

After independence in 1948, the city became part of the Tenasserim Division, which also included today's Mon State. In 1974, Mon State was carved out of Tenasserim and Dawei became the capital of the truncated division. In 1989, the city's English name was changed from Tavoy to Dawei, and Tenasserim became Tanintharyi.

Climate
Dawei features an extreme tropical monsoon climate (Köppen climate classification Am), similar to Sittwe further north-west. There is a substantial dry season from November to March, but in the wet season the influence of local mountains causes Dawei to receive as much as  precipitation per month. Apart from the Chocó region of Colombia, and the area around Mount Cameroon in Africa, it is possibly the wettest lowland tropical region in the world.

Transport

Only recently was Dawei connected to the rest of Myanmar by road and rail. A transnational highway and a railway line across the Tenasserim Hills connecting Dawei and Bangkok are planned if a proposed deep water port project goes ahead. This port could significantly reduce Singapore-bound traffic when completed.

Dawei Airport

The airport serves as the domestic airport for the city of Dawei and the neighbouring towns. The government plans to upgrade the airport to serve as a hub for tourism.

Dawei Railway Station

It is the southernmost station and terminus in Myanmar. However the railway was partly constructed for a further 40 km approximately to the south towards Min Dat bridge and south Myanmar. Work ceased on this line in about 2012 but several partly constructed sections with bridges over rivers are visible on Google Earth.

Economy
There are plans to construct a deep water port in Dawei. In November 2010, the Myanmar Port Authority signed a US$8.6 billion deal with Italian-Thai Development to develop the seaport at Dawei. The Dawei Special Economic Zone would become Myanmar's first special economic zone (SEZ), which includes plans to develop a  industrial estate, with sea, land (railway and road) infrastructure links to Thailand, Cambodia, and Vietnam, as well as a gas pipeline to Thailand's Kanchanaburi Province and commercial and residential developments.

The project has been opposed by a significant portion of the local ethnic population.

Dawei longyis (sarong) are one of the area's well-known products. The area produces rubber, dried fish, and teakwood. It also produces cashew nuts and betel nuts and exports them through local traders to China, India, and Thailand. Dawei is also known for its variety of tropical fruits such as pineapples, a variety of mangoes, mangosteens, and durian. There is one fruit called zin thi (in Dawei language), which can only be found in Dawei and surrounding areas.

Higher education
Dawei Education College
Dawei University
Technological University, Dawei
Computer University, Dawei
Government Agricultural Institute, Dawei
Nursing Training School

Notable sites
 Maungmagan Beach
Maungmagan Hot Springs
Shwe Taung Sar Pagoda, Payagyi
Pe Hot Springs
Launglon Bok Islands
Paradise Beach
Grand Father Beach
Sin Htauk Beach
Wa Zwam Chaung Waterfall and hot springs
Ka Lone Htar Creek
Sargara Ancient City (Old town of the present Dawei)
Mokhti Ancient City
Thayet Chaung Waterfall

Notable residents 
 Ba Swe, 2nd Prime Minister of Union of Burma 
 Richard Bartholomew
 Ngwe Gaing, Burmese artist
 Ma Chit Po, only woman to be awarded the Thura Medal

See also 
 List of railway stations in Myanmar
 Phu Nam Ron (Htee Kee)

References

External links

Township capitals of Myanmar
Populated places in Tanintharyi Region